Sir Joseph De Courcy Laffan, 1st Baronet (8 May 1786 – 7 July 1848) was a noted Irish physician.

Laffan treated troops in the Peninsular War, he was the personal physician (Physician-in-Ordinary) to Queen Victoria's father the Duke of Kent and also the Duke of York (an elder son of King George III).

Laffan, the son of Walter Laffan, was born on 15 March 1786 in Cashel in County Tipperary, Ireland and was educated at the lay college in St Patrick's College, Maynooth, in the early 19th century. He was made a Baronet, of Otham in the County of Kent, in 1828, for treating the Duke of York for the dropsy. He died on 7 July 1848. 
, the title becoming extinct on his death.

His brother was the Roman Catholic Archbishop Robert Laffan of Cashel.

References

1786 births
1848 deaths
Alumni of St Patrick's College, Maynooth
People from County Tipperary
Baronets in the Baronetage of the United Kingdom
Physicians-in-Ordinary